"Before I Let You Go" is a song by American R&B group Blackstreet, recorded for the group's self-titled debut album (1994). The song was released as the third single for the album in November 1994.  The song was notable for featuring lead vocals from Dave Hollister who joined the group upon the album's release.

"Before I Let You Go" peaked at number seven on the Billboard Hot 100 chart and number two on the Hot R&B Singles chart.  This made it the group's highest charting single on both charts respectively before it was surpassed by "No Diggity" two years later.  The song lyrically focuses on the narrator who does not want to lose the love of his life out of concern that she is no longer romantically interested and wants her to "say goodnight" as opposed to "say goodbye."

Track listing
12", CD, Maxi
"Before I Let You Go" (Main Mix One) - 5:00
"Before I Let You Go" (Main Mix Two) - 5:00
"Before I Let You Go" (Instrumental) - 5:00
"Before I Let You Go" (Acapella Mix) - 4:52
"Before I Let You Go" (Reggae Dub Mix) - 5:00
"Before I Let You Go" (T.R. Mix) - 4:56
"Before I Let You Go" (Blackstreet Live Version) - 5:10

Personnel
Information taken from Discogs.
drums – Gerald Heyward
engineering – Serban Ghenea, John Hanes, George Mayers
guitar – Serban Ghenea
mixing – Serban Ghenea, John Hanes, George Mayers, Teddy Riley
production – Teddy Riley
remixing – Teddy Riley
writing – C. Hannibal, D. Hollister, M. Riley, T. Riley, L. Sylvers

Charts

Weekly charts

Year-end charts

Notes

External links

1994 singles
Blackstreet songs
Song recordings produced by Teddy Riley
Songs written by Teddy Riley
Songs written by Leon Sylvers III
1994 songs
Interscope Records singles
Songs written by Dave Hollister
Contemporary R&B ballads
1990s ballads